William V. Turner was a state representative in Alabama during the Reconstruction era. He testified about intimidation and balloting issues in 1871. He represented Elmore County. He campaigned for U.S. Senator George E. Spencer and was accused of receiving patronage positions in exchange. He was a school teacher in Wetumpka and an organizer in the Union League.

He served as editor of the Elmore Republican.

See also
List of African-American officeholders during Reconstruction

References

Members of the Alabama House of Representatives
People from Wetumpka, Alabama
19th-century American politicians
African-American politicians during the Reconstruction Era
Year of birth missing
Year of death missing